The International Molinological Society (TIMS) has been active since 1965 and is the only organization dedicated to mills and molinology on a worldwide scale. It brings together more than six hundred members, mostly from Europe and the USA. TIMS is a non-profit organization with cultural and scientific aims. It was founded in 1973 after earlier international meetings (Symposia) in 1965 and 1969. The original initiative for these meetings was taken by the Portuguese Molinologist Dr. João Miguel dos Santos Simões.

External links 
The International Molinological Society (TIMS)

International Molinological